Martin Prohászka (born 18 August 1973) is a Slovak former football player.

Prohászka played for FC Nitra, appearing in 48 league matches, before moving to the Czech Republic to play for SFC Opava in 1997. Prohászka played eventually for Sparta Prague, where he won the Gambrinus liga title. From Sparta, he moved to Baník Ostrava, where he spent several seasons and the first half of Baník's championship 2003-2004 season. For the second half of the season, Prohászka moved to Viktoria Žižkov. His last club was Second League's FC Vítkovice. In January 2010 Prohászka ended his professional career.

References

External links

People from Nové Zámky
Sportspeople from the Nitra Region
Slovak footballers
Slovakia international footballers
1973 births
Living people
FC Nitra players
Czech First League players
SFC Opava players
AC Sparta Prague players
FC Baník Ostrava players
FK Viktoria Žižkov players
Tractor S.C. players
MFK Vítkovice players
Expatriate footballers in the Czech Republic
Expatriate footballers in Iran

Association football forwards
Czechoslovak footballers
Slovak expatriate sportspeople in Iran
Slovak expatriate sportspeople in the Czech Republic
Slovak expatriate footballers